Krapinske Toplice is a city and municipality in  Krapina-Zagorje County in Croatia. According to the 2011 census, there are 5,367 inhabitants in the area, absolute majority of which are Croats.

The settlements in the municipality are:
 Čret, population 571
 Donje Vino, population 123
 Gregurovec, population 131
 Hršak Breg, population 150
 Jasenovac Zagorski, population 72
 Jurjevec, population 154
 Klokovec, population 755
 Klupci, population 119
 Krapinske Toplice, population 1,295
 Lovreća Sela, population 209
 Mala Erpenja, population 606
 Maturovec, population 84
 Oratje, population 170
 Selno, population 395
 Slivonja Jarek, population 96
 Viča Sela, population 189
 Vrtnjakovec, population 248

References

External links
 Krapinske Toplice tourist portal

Populated places in Krapina-Zagorje County
Spa towns in Croatia
Municipalities of Croatia